The Areopagus is a prominent rock outcropping located northwest of the Acropolis in Athens, Greece. Its English name is the Late Latin composite form of the Greek name Areios Pagos, translated "Hill of Ares". The name Areopagus also referred, in classical times, to the Athenian governing council, later restricted to the Athenian judicial council or court that tried cases of deliberate homicide, wounding and religious matters, as well as cases involving arson of olive trees, because they convened in this location.
The war god Ares was supposed to have been tried by the other gods on the Areopagus for the murder of Poseidon's son Halirrhothius (a typical example of an aetiological myth).

History

The exact origin of the Areopagus is unclear. In pre-classical times (before the 5th century BC), the Areopagus may have been a council of elders for the city of Athens, and membership was restricted to those who had held high public office, in this case that of Archon. Conversely, it may have also begun almost exclusively as a homicide court and judicial body. While there is no true consensus, homicide trials seem to have been held on the Areopagus hill as early as the 7th century BC and possibly as far back as the mid-8th century BC.

In 594 BC, the Areopagus was heavily restructured by Solon, as was the rest of the Athenian state. Aristotle suggests that he confirmed its competence over cases of treason (eisangelia, εἰσαγγελία) and its guardianship of the laws (nomophylakia, νομοφυλακία). Solon's entrusting of the nomophylakia to the Areopagus may imply that the council was invested with maintaining the stability of his reforms after he left Athens.

Under the reforms of Cleisthenes enacted in 508/507 BC, the Boule (βουλή) or council was expanded from  400 to 500 men, and was formed of 50 men from each of ten clans or phylai (φυλαί). There is very little evidence to suggest that Cleisthenes may have altered the composition or the jurisdiction of the Areopagus, given that he himself was likely a member of the council.

In 462/461 BC, Ephialtes may have put through reforms which deprived the Areopagus of almost all its functions except that of a murder tribunal in favour of Heliaia. While this perception is corroborated by most ancient authors, it may have merely been a retrojection by those writing long after the 5th century BC. This is because there is little evidence to suggest that the Areopagus had done anything of note to warrant an attack on its powers by the time of Ephialtes. Regardless, over the course of the 5th century BC, the Areopagus did lose its competence over eisangelia and dokimasia (δοκιμασία), the initial examination of those elected into office, though it is unknown if this was because of Ephialtes.

In The Eumenides of Aeschylus (458 BC), the Areopagus is the site of the trial of Orestes for killing his mother (Clytemnestra) and her lover (Aegisthus). 

Phryne, a hetaera of the 4th century BC who was famed for her beauty, appeared before the Areopagus accused of profaning the Eleusinian mysteries. One story has her letting her cloak drop and so impressing the judges with her almost divine form that she was summarily acquitted.

In the second half of the 4th century BC, the Areopagus grew in influence and political power, and contributed to the anti-Macedonian faction of the city. It conducted an investigation on charges of treason and bribery (apophasis, ἀπόφασις) against Demosthenes as a result of the Harpalus affair in 324 BC. At the same time, the Areopagus may have also regained power over the nomophylakia, which had been lost to reforms in the 5th century BC.

The Areopagus continued to function as a body of former archons in Roman times. After Sulla's capture of Athens in 86/87 BC and subsequent restructuring of the city's political structure, it was elevated to one of the most prestigious and politically powerful institutions in Athens. The Roman statesman Cicero once said of the council, "when one says 'the Athenian state is ruled by the council,' the words 'of the Areopagus' are omitted." 

Acts 17:16-34 prominently features the Areopagus as the setting for the Apostle Paul's Areopagus sermon during his visit to Athens, notably leading to the conversion of Dionysius the Areopagite. However, it is unclear whether Paul gave his speech before the Areopagus council in the setting of a judicial investigation or trial, or on the physical location of the Areopagus hill as an informal speech. Additionally, the Areopagus likely would not have met on the actual Areopagus hill by the time of Paul's visit, but rather in the agora or the Stoa Basileios. 

The Areopagus ceased operation as a political council by at least the early 5th century AD, according to Theodoret of Cyrus.

After its closure, the Areopagus hill was inhabited by various houses and dwellings while under Byzantine rule. The only buildings of note on the hill during this time included a church and monastery both dedicated to Dionysios the Areopagite.

The term "Areopagus" also refers to the judicial body of aristocratic origin that subsequently formed the higher court of modern Greece.

Near the Areopagus was also constructed the basilica of Dionysius Areopagites.

Modern references
The English poet John Milton titled his defence of freedom of the press "Areopagitica", arguing that the censors of ancient Athens, based at the Areopagus, had not practiced the kind of prior restraint of publication being called for in the English Parliament of Milton's time.
The Areopagus Society, formed in 1893, is one of the oldest clubs at the preparatory Hotchkiss School, Connecticut, USA, and meets to debate on certain topics.
"Areopagus" is the title of the second poem in Irish poet Louis MacNeice's 1952 collection, Ten Burnt Offerings.

See also 
Areopagus sermon
Areopagus of Eastern Continental Greece, a regional Greek administration during the Greek Revolution of 1821, which was named after the Ancient Athenian institution.

Footnotes

Further reading
 The Constitutional Antiquities of Sparta and Athens by Gustav Gilbert
 Pantologia by John Mason Good, Olinthus Gregory, Newton Bosworth. p. 565
 The London Encyclopaedia, Volume 2. Edited by Thomas Curtis. p. 647

External links

 Acts 17:16-34 – A Biblical account of St. Paul discussing with the Areopagus the nature of the Christian God.  Also referred to is the story concerning the altar to "The Unknown God."
 Athens Photo Guide
 

Ancient Greek geography
Landmarks in Athens
Greek courts of appeal
Ancient Greek buildings and structures in Athens
Ares
Hills of Athens
Ancient Greek law